The Party of the Communes is a progressive political party in Uruguay. It is a member organisation of the ruling Broad Front Progressive Encounter-New Majority and represents local administrations.

External links
Official web site

Broad Front (Uruguay)
Political parties in Uruguay
Political parties with year of establishment missing
Progressive parties